Tino di Camaino (c. 1280 – c. 1337) was an Italian sculptor.

Born in Siena, the son of architect Camaino di Crescentino, he was a pupil of Giovanni Pisano, whom he helped work on the façade of the Cathedral of Siena. Later Tino followed his master to Pisa, where in 1311 he became responsible for the work on the cathedral. In July 1315, Tino departed Pisa for Siena, where he executed the funerary monument of Emperor Henry VII, leaving the funerary monument of Arrigo VII in Pisa unfinished. Subsequently, he executed similar works in Siena and Florence, including the famous tomb of Bishop Orso at Santa Maria del Fiore and the tomb of Gastone della Torre in the museum of Santa Croce, along with a Charity probably originally on the Florence Baptistery.

From 1323 he worked in Naples, under King Robert of Anjou. Again he executed several funerary monuments, including those of Catherine of Austria in San Lorenzo Maggiore and Queen Mary of Hungary in Santa Maria Donnaregina. Other works are to be found in the church of Badia Cava dei Tirreni. He died in Naples around 1337.

References

Bibliography
Enzo Carli, Tino Di Camaino: Scultore (Firenze: Felice Le Monnier, 1934)
Carlos Sastre Vázquez, ''Contemplando una obra maestra de Tino di Camaino", Ruta Cicloturística del Románico Internacional, XXX (2012), pp. 65–69 c-sastre-camainobarberinoorso

1280 births
1337 deaths
People from Siena
14th-century Italian sculptors
Italian male sculptors